The 2005–06 season was the 103rd season in the existence of U.S. Cremonese and the club's first season back in the second division of Italian football. In addition to the domestic league, Cremonese participated in this season's edition of the Coppa Italia.

Players

First-team squad

Transfers

Pre-season and friendlies

Competitions

Overall record

Serie B

League table

Results summary

Results by round

Matches

Coppa Italia

References

U.S. Cremonese seasons
Cremonese